American singer and songwriter Bonnie McKee has co-written eight number-one singles, which have sold more than 30 million copies worldwide combined. Her debut album Trouble was released in September 2004. She singlehandedly wrote all but one song on the album, some when she was 14 and 15 years old. A standalone single, "American Girl," was released in 2013. An album was due for release in spring of 2014 but, by the end of the year, had not yet materialized. Instead, an EP, Bombastic was released in June 2015.

McKee also has over 51 songwriting credits for songs that have been recorded by other artists. Eight of these have topped either the British or the American charts. McKee has collaborated with pop singer Katy Perry, and the pair have written five of Perry's number-one singles together: "California Gurls", "Teenage Dream", "Last Friday Night (T.G.I.F.)", "Part of Me" and "Roar". McKee has also written four other songs recorded by Perry. She co-wrote five songs on Britney Spears' seventh studio album Femme Fatale, including "Hold It Against Me", which topped the Billboard Hot 100. McKee has co-written two singles that reached the number-one position on the UK Singles Chart: "Dynamite" by Taio Cruz and "How We Do (Party)" by Rita Ora. In 2012, McKee co-wrote three songs on Adam Lambert's album Trespassing and two songs for Kesha's album Warrior, "C'Mon" and "Supernatural", the former of which served as the second single from the record. She also co-wrote two songs that appear on Leona Lewis' album Glassheart, including the album's second single "Lovebird". McKee has also co-written songs that have been recorded by Christina Aguilera, Kelly Clarkson, Cher, Carly Rae Jepsen and Ellie Goulding among others.

Songs

References 

McKee, Bonnie